The Two-man bobsleigh competition at the 1988 Winter Olympics in Calgary was held on 20 and 21 February, at Canada Olympic Park.

Results

References

Bobsleigh at the 1988 Winter Olympics